After the Verdict may refer to:

 After the Verdict (film), a 1929 British-German drama film, based on the novel
 After the Verdict (novel), a 1924 novel by Robert Hichens
 After the Verdict (TV series), an upcoming Australian drama television series